Poki is an unclassified West Chadic language of Bauchi State, Nigeria mentioned in Campbell & Hoskison (1972).  It has not been attested since.

References 

West Chadic languages